This is the discography of American rapper Scarface. It consists of eleven studio albums, two compilation albums, two mixtapes and nineteen singles.

Albums

Studio albums

Collaborative albums

Compilation albums

Mixtapes

Singles

Guest appearances

References 

Hip hop discographies
Discographies of American artists